Radiation and health may refer to:

Electromagnetic radiation and health
Health threat from cosmic rays
Ionizing radiation#Health effects
Mobile phone radiation and health

See also
Radiological hazard (disambiguation)
:Category:Radiation health effects